Irene (Irena) Rima Makaryk is a Canadian English-language academic, author, and distinguished professor at Ottawa University.

Education 
Makaryk has a 1974 bachelor of arts degree, a 1975 master of arts degree and a 1980 PhD, all from the University of Toronto.

Career 
Makaryk joined Ottawa University in 1981 and was given the rank of distinguished professor in 2018; she teaches English at the faculty of arts. She is also the vice-dean of the faculty of graduate and postdoctoral studies.

Her research focusses on theatrical modernism, Shakespeare, Ukrainian Shakespeare, the arts in times of war, Soviet theatre, Les Kurbas, cultural history, and Arctic diaries.

Makaryk appears on the Canadian Broadcasting Company's Ideas (radio show) on November 3rd 2021.

Selected publications 

 Irena Makaryk and Diana Brydon (editors), Shakespeare in Canada: A World Elsewhere, University of Toronto Press, 2002 
 Irena Makaryk, April in Paris: Theatricality, Modernism, and Politics at the 1925 Art Deco Expo. University of Toronto Press, 2018
 Irena Makaryk, Encyclopedia of Contemporary Literary Theory: Approaches, Scholars, Terms, University of Toronto Press, 1993 
 Irena R. Makaryk, About the Harrowing of Hell: A Seventeenth-Century Ukrainian Play in Its European Context, Dovehouse Editions 1989 
 Irena Makaryk and Virlana Tkacz, Modernism in Kyiv: Jubilant Experimentation, University of Toronto Press, 2010

References 

Living people
Year of birth missing (living people)
Academic staff of the University of Ottawa
21st-century Canadian writers
20th-century Canadian writers
21st-century Canadian women writers
Shakespearean scholars
University of Toronto alumni